Baby Huey & the Babysitters was an American band formed in Gary, Indiana. The band, founded in 1963, was the idea of organist / trumpeter Melvyn Jones and guitarist Johnny Ross. James Ramey was their front man, and he adopted the stage name of "Baby Huey" (after the cartoon/comic book character Baby Huey). They were well known on the club scene in Chicago.

Background and formation
The group came into being as a result of Johnny Ross; Melvyn Jones (later to be known as Melvyn "Deacon" Jones); and James Ramey getting together. In the beginning they would practice in the sound-proof room at the home of Melvyn Jones. The room was built for Melvyn and his drummer brother, Harold Jones, to practice in.

Early recording career (1960s)
During their early career they recorded four songs released on singles between 1964 and 1966: "Monkey Man," "Messin' with the Kid," "Just Being Careful," and "Beg Me." They went to Paris, France to play at the coming out party for the daughter of the Baron de Rothschild. In 1966 they were added to the client roster of Capitol Booking.

Billboard, in its May 17, 1969 issue, reported that the band was due to appear on the Merv Griffin Show (May 21).

The 1970s
By 1970, most of the original Babysitter members had left and had been replaced by new personnel. Melvyn Jones was one of the last original founding members to leave.

Ramey died on October 28, 1970. He was in the midst of recording the band's debut album for the Curtom label. The album that was released posthumously only featured some songs by the Babysitters. The rest were with Curtom session musicians.

The Babysitters re-formed, briefly, to play at Ramey's funeral. Manager Marv Stuart would later take some former members, including Dave Cook, to form Goliath with Chaka Khan.

Post Baby Huey & the Babysitters
Melvyn Jones joined The Impressions touring band, and became A&R man for Curtom Records. He also worked with Freddie King and John Lee Hooker. He later came to be known as Melvyn "Deacon" Jones. He died at the age of 73 in Hollywood, California.

Johnny Ross recorded some singles, and had his own cable television show.

Dennis Moore, the original drummer, killed himself after coming back from Vietnam, having lost his ability to play drums. Because he had dropped out of school to go to Paris with the band, he had lost his draft exempt status, and had been drafted.

Johnny Ross died in 2006 from a heart condition related to an appendicitis attack.

Past members

Original line up early-mid 1960s
 Baby Huey aka James Ramey : lead singer
 Johnny Ross : lead guitar
 Melvyn Jones : trumpet and organ
 Larry Sales : bass guitar
 Dennis Moore : drums

Added later
 Byron Watkins : saxophone
 Charles Clark : saxophone

Late 1960s members
 James Ramey (Baby Huey) : lead vocals
 Melvyn Jones : keyboards
 Othello Anderson : flute
 Rene Smith : percussion
 Byron Watkins : tenor saxophone
 Rick Marcotte : trumpet
 Alton Littles : trumpet
 Danny O'Neil : guitar
 Dave Cook : organ
 Dan Alfano : bass guitar
 Plato Jones : bongos

Additional personnel
 Jack Renee : unknown instrument
 Philip Henry : unknown instrument
 Moose (nickname) : Drums

Discography (partial)
 "Just Being Careful" / "Messin' with the Kid" .... Shann 73924 (1965)
 "Just Being Careful" / "Messin' with the Kid" .... USA 801 (1965)
 "Monkey Man" / "Messin' with the Kid" .... St. Lawrence 1002 (1965, white label only)
 "Monkey Man" / "Beg Me" .... St. Lawrence 1002 (1965, issued on both blue and white label)
 "Monkey Man" / "Messin' with the Kid" .... Satellite 2013 (1967)
 "Mighty Mighty Children Pt. I" / "Mighty Mighty Children Pt. II" .... Curtom CR 1939 (1971)

References

American funk musical groups
American soul musical groups
Musical groups from Indiana
Musical groups established in 1963
Musical groups disestablished in 1970
1963 establishments in Indiana
1970 disestablishments in Indiana